Gary Dajaun Trent Jr. (born January 18, 1999) is an American professional basketball player for the Toronto Raptors of the National Basketball Association (NBA). He played college basketball for the Duke Blue Devils. As a high school senior, Trent was selected as a McDonald's All-American.

Early life
Gary is the son of Roxanne Holt and Gary Trent, an American former professional basketball player. He has three brothers named Garyson, Grayson and Graydon. Gary's father, Gary Trent Sr., played on the 1993 U.S. Olympic Festival North Team that finished with a 4–0 record and captured the gold medal. He also played basketball at Ohio University, nine years in the NBA for the Portland Trail Blazers, Toronto Raptors, Dallas Mavericks and Minnesota Timberwolves and also competed in Greece and Italy.

Trent Jr. first attended Apple Valley High School in Apple Valley, Minnesota. As a sophomore, he averaged 21.5 points per game. As a junior, he averaged 26.4 points per game and 5.8 rebounds per game, while earning Gatorade Minnesota Player of the Year, first-team Minneapolis All Metro honors, in addition to being named a first-team junior All-American by Maxpreps. Trent Jr. Averaged 22.2 points per game on the Nike EYBL Circuit for his AAU team, Howard Pulley Panthers.

Before his senior year, Trent Jr. decided to transfer to Prolific Prep Academy in Napa, California. As a senior, he averaged 31.8 points, 6.4 rebounds and 3.8 assist per game while leading his team to a 29-3 overall record. Following his senior year he was selected to play in both 2017 Jordan Brand Classic and 2017 McDonald's All-American Boys Game.

Recruiting
Trent Jr. was rated as a five-star recruit and considered one of the best players in the 2017 high school class by Scout.com, Rivals.com and ESPN. Trent Jr. Was ranked as the No.8 overall recruit and No.1 shooting guard in the 2017 high school class.

College career
On November 10, 2016, Trent Jr. committed to Duke University and  signed his letter of intent on the same day. On December 9, 2017, Trent Jr. scored 25 points in an 89–84 loss against Boston College, where he also tied the Duke Freshman record for six three point shots made. On January 13, 2018, despite battling an illness, Trent scored 19 points to beat Wake Forest. Against Miami on January 15, Trent scored a career-high 30 points in a Duke comeback victory. On January 22, 2018, Trent was named Atlantic Coast Conference Co-Player and Rookie of the week. On January 29, 2018, he scored a double-double of 22 points 10 rebounds in an 88–66 victory against Notre Dame. Duke would enter the ACC tournament as the No. 2 seed and defeat Notre Dame in the first round. On March 9, 2018, Trent Jr. scored 20 points with 6 rebounds in a 74–69 loss in the semi-finals against rival North Carolina.

Following Duke's loss in the 2018 NCAA men's basketball tournament, Trent announced his intention to forgo his final three seasons of collegiate eligibility and declare for the 2018 NBA draft, where he was expected to be a first round selection.

Professional career

Portland Trail Blazers (2018–2021)
On June 21, 2018, Trent Jr. was drafted by the Sacramento Kings with the 37th overall selection in the 2018 NBA draft. He was subsequently traded to the Portland Trail Blazers. Trent Jr. signed with the Trail Blazers to a three-year deal on July 6. On July 6, he scored 16 points in his NBA Summer League debut against the Utah Jazz. On 4 November 2018, Trent Jr. made his NBA debut in a home game against the Minnesota Timberwolves. On January 21, 2019, the Blazers assigned him to the Texas Legends for an NBA G League. Trent Jr. would return to the NBA and appeared in 15 games for Portland.

On January 18, 2020, Trent Jr. scored a then career-high 30 points in a 106–119 loss to the Oklahoma City Thunder with five rebounds, three steals, an assist and a block. In his second year, Trent Jr. appeared in 61 games and 5 playoff games.

Toronto Raptors (2021–present) 
On March 25, 2021, the Toronto Raptors acquired Trent Jr. and Rodney Hood in a trade for Norman Powell. Trent Jr. scored a then career-high 31 points in a March 31 loss to the Oklahoma City Thunder. On April 2, in a 53-points blowout win over the Golden State Warriors, Trent Jr. recorded the second-highest plus-minus (+54) since the league started tracking the stat in 1996. On April 10, he scored a career-high 44 points on 17 of 19 shooting in a 135–115 victory over the Cleveland Cavaliers. On August 2, 2021, Trent Jr. signed a three-year, $54 million deal with the Raptors.

On January 25, 2022, Trent Jr. scored 32 points in a 125-113 win vs the Charlotte Hornets. On a back-to-back on January 26, he scored 32 points with six made three-pointers in a game against the Chicago Bulls. In a triple overtime game played on January 29, Trent Jr. scored 33 points and had five steals in a 124–120 win over the Miami Heat. On January 31, Trent Jr. dropped a career high in three-pointers made in a 106–100 win over the Atlanta Hawks, scoring 31 points and making nine three-pointers; he joined Kyle Lowry as the only Raptors to hit 5+ three-pointers in four straight games. On February 1, Trent Jr. recorded his fifth straight 30-point game, scoring 33 points in a 110–106 win over the Heat, joining DeMar DeRozan as the only other Raptor to do so. On February 10, Trent Jr. scored a season-high 42 points, along with five steals and five made three-pointers, in a 139–120 victory over the Houston Rockets. On March 11, Trent Jr. tied his season-high 42 points, along with eight rebounds, on 8–11 shooting from three-point range in a 107–102 over the reigning Western Conference champion Phoenix Suns.

Career statistics

NBA

Regular season

|-
| style="text-align:left;"| 
| style="text-align:left;"| Portland
| 15 || 1 || 7.4 || .320 || .238 || .429 || .7 || .3 || .1 || .1 || 2.7
|-
| style="text-align:left;"| 
| style="text-align:left;"| Portland
| 61 || 8 || 21.8 || .444 || .418 || .822 || 1.6 || 1.0 || .8 || .3 || 8.9
|-
| style="text-align:left;" rowspan=2| 
| style="text-align:left;"| Portland
| 41 || 23 || 30.8 || .414 || .397 || .773 || 2.2 || 1.4 || .9 || .1 || 15.6
|-
| style="text-align:left;"| Toronto
| 17 || 15 || 31.8 || .395 || .355 || .806 || 3.6 || 1.3 || 1.1 || .2 || 16.2
|-
| style="text-align:left;"|
| style="text-align:left;"| Toronto
| 70 || 69 || 35.0 || .414 || .383 || .853 || 2.7 || 2.0 || 1.7 || .3 || 18.3
|- class="sortbottom"
| style="text-align:center;" colspan="2"| Career
| 204 || 116 || 27.9 || .416 || .389 || .820 || 2.2 || 1.4 || 1.1 || .2 || 13.5

Playoffs

|-
| align="left" | 2020
| align="left" | Portland
| 5 || 1 || 30.6 || .356 || .417 || .857 || 2.0 || .6 || .8 || .0 || 9.6
|-
| align="left" | 2022
| align="left" | Toronto
| 6 || 6 || 33.2 || .378 || .333 || .895 || 1.8 || 1.3 || 1.0 || .5 || 15.3
|- class="sortbottom"
| style="text-align:center;" colspan="2"| Career
| 11 || 7 || 32.0 || .370 || .365 || .885 || 1.9 || 1.0 || .9 || .3 || 12.7

College

|-
| style="text-align:left;"| 2017–18
| style="text-align:left;"| Duke
| 37 || 37 || 33.8 || .415 || .402 || .876 || 4.2 || 1.4 || 1.2 || .2 || 14.5

References

External links

Duke Blue Devils bio

1999 births
Living people
African-American basketball players
American expatriate basketball people in Canada
American men's basketball players
Apple Valley High School (Minnesota) alumni
Basketball players from Columbus, Ohio
Duke Blue Devils men's basketball players
McDonald's High School All-Americans
Portland Trail Blazers players
Sacramento Kings draft picks
Shooting guards
Texas Legends players
Toronto Raptors players
21st-century African-American sportspeople